The End of History and the Last Man is a 1992 book of political philosophy by American political scientist Francis Fukuyama which argues that with the ascendancy of Western liberal democracy—which occurred after the Cold War (1945–1991) and the dissolution of the Soviet Union (1991)—humanity has reached "not just... the passing of a particular period of post-war history, but the end of history as such: That is, the end-point of mankind's ideological evolution and the universalization of Western liberal democracy as the final form of human government." For the book, which is an expansion of his essay "The End of History?" (published in the summer of 1989, months before the fall of the Berlin Wall), Fukuyama draws upon the philosophies and ideologies of Georg Wilhelm Friedrich Hegel and Karl Marx, who define human history as a linear progression, from one socioeconomic epoch to another.

Overview 

Fukuyama argues that history should be viewed as an evolutionary process, and that the end of history, in this sense, means that liberal democracy is the final form of government for all nations. According to Fukuyama, since the French Revolution, liberal democracy has repeatedly proven to be a fundamentally better system (ethically, politically, economically) than any of the alternatives, and so there can be no progression from it to an alternative system. Fukuyama claims not that events will stop occurring in the future, but rather that all that will happen in the future (even if totalitarianism returns) is that democracy will become more and more prevalent in the long term.

Some argue that Fukuyama presents "American-style" democracy as the only "correct" political system and argues that all countries must inevitably follow this particular system of government. However, many Fukuyama scholars claim this is a misreading of his work. Fukuyama's argument is only that in the future there will be more and more governments that use the framework of parliamentary democracy and that contain markets of some sort. He has said:

The End of History was never linked to a specifically American model of social or political organization. Following Alexandre Kojève, the Russian-French philosopher who inspired my original argument, I believe that the European Union more accurately reflects what the world will look like at the end of history than the contemporary United States.  The EU's attempt to transcend sovereignty and traditional power politics by establishing a transnational rule of law is much more in line with a "post-historical" world than the Americans' continuing belief in God, national sovereignty, and their military.

Arguments in favour
An argument in favour of Fukuyama's thesis is the democratic peace theory, which argues that mature democracies rarely or never go to war with one another. This theory has faced criticism, with arguments largely resting on conflicting definitions of "war" and "mature democracy". Part of the difficulty in assessing the theory is that democracy as a widespread global phenomenon emerged only very recently in human history, which makes generalizing about it difficult. (See also list of wars between democracies.)

Other major empirical evidence includes the elimination of interstate warfare in South America, Southeast Asia, and Eastern Europe among countries that moved from military dictatorships to liberal democracies.

According to several studies, the end of the Cold War and the subsequent increase in the number of liberal democratic states were accompanied by a sudden and dramatic decline in total warfare, interstate wars, ethnic wars, revolutionary wars, and the number of refugees and displaced persons.

Criticisms

Jacques Derrida
In Specters of Marx: The State of the Debt, the Work of Mourning and the New International (1993), Jacques Derrida criticized Fukuyama as a "come-lately reader" of the philosopher-statesman Alexandre Kojève (1902–1968), who "in the tradition of Leo Strauss" (1899–1973), in the 1950s, already had described the society of the U.S. as the "realization of communism"; and said that the public-intellectual celebrity of Fukuyama and the mainstream popularity of  his book, The End of History and the Last Man, were symptoms of right-wing, cultural anxiety about ensuring the "Death of Marx". In criticising Fukuyama's celebration of the economic and cultural hegemony of Western liberalism, Derrida said:

Therefore, Derrida said: "This end of History is essentially a Christian eschatology. It is consonant with the current discourse of the Pope on the European Community: Destined to become [either] a Christian State or [a] Super-State; [but] this community would still belong, therefore, to some Holy Alliance"; that Fukuyama practised an intellectual  "sleight-of-hand trick", by using empirical data whenever suitable to his message, and by appealing to an abstract ideal whenever the empirical data contradicted his end-of-history thesis; and that Fukuyama sees the United States and the European Union as imperfect political entities, when compared to the distinct ideals of liberal democracy and of the free market, but understands that such abstractions (ideals) are not demonstrated with empirical evidence, nor ever could be empirically demonstrated, because they are philosophical and religious abstractions that originated from the Gospels of Philosophy of Hegel; and yet, Fukuyama still uses empirical observations to prove his thesis, which he, himself, agrees are imperfect and incomplete, to validate his end-of-history thesis, which remains an abstraction.

Radical Islam, tribalism, and the "Clash of Civilizations"
Various Western commentators have described the thesis of The End of History as flawed because it does not sufficiently take into account the power of ethnic loyalties and religious fundamentalism as a counter-force to the spread of liberal democracy, with the specific example of Islamic fundamentalism, or radical Islam, as the most powerful of these.

Benjamin Barber wrote a 1992 article and a 1995 book, Jihad vs. McWorld, that addressed this theme. Barber described "McWorld" as a secular, liberal, corporate-friendly transformation of the world and used the word "jihad" to refer to the competing forces of tribalism and religious fundamentalism, with a special emphasis on Islamic fundamentalism.

Samuel P. Huntington wrote a 1993 essay, The Clash of Civilizations, in direct response to The End of History; he then expanded the essay into a 1996 book, The Clash of Civilizations and the Remaking of World Order. In the essay and book, Huntington argued that the temporary conflict between ideologies is being replaced by the ancient conflict between civilizations. The dominant civilization decides the form of human government, and these will not be constant. He especially singled out Islam, which he described as having "bloody borders".

After the September 11, 2001, attacks, The End of History was cited by some commentators as a symbol of the supposed naiveté and undue optimism of the Western world during the 1990s, in thinking that the end of the Cold War also represented the end of major global conflict. In the weeks after the attacks, Fareed Zakaria called the events "the end of the end of history", while George Will wrote that history had "returned from vacation".

Fukuyama did discuss radical Islam briefly in The End of History. He argued that Islam is not an imperialist force like Stalinism and fascism; that is, it has little intellectual or emotional appeal outside the Islamic "heartlands". Fukuyama pointed to the economic and political difficulties that Iran and Saudi Arabia face and argued that such states are fundamentally unstable: either they will become democracies with a Muslim society (like  Turkey) or they will simply disintegrate. Moreover, when Islamic states have actually been created, they were easily dominated by the powerful Western states.

In October 2001, Fukuyama, in a Wall Street Journal opinion piece, responded to criticism of his thesis after the September 11 attacks and supported his views by saying, "I believe that in the end I remain right". He further explained that what he meant by "End of History" was the evolution of human political system, toward that of the "liberal-democratic West". He also noted that his original thesis "does not imply a world free from conflict, nor the disappearance of culture as a distinguishing characteristic of societies".

The resurgence of Russia and China
Another challenge to the "end of history" thesis is the growth in the economic and political power of two countries, Russia and China. China has a one-party state government, while Russia, though formally a democracy, is often described as an autocracy; it is categorized as an anocracy in the Polity data series.

Azar Gat, Professor of National Security at Tel Aviv University, argued this point in his 2007  Foreign Affairs article, "The Return of Authoritarian Great Powers", stating that the success of these two countries could "end the end of history". Gat also discussed radical Islam, but stated that the movements associated with it "represent no viable alternative to modernity and pose no significant military threat to the developed world". He considered the challenge of China and Russia to be the  major threat, since they could pose a viable rival model which could inspire other states.

This view was echoed by Robert Kagan in his 2008 book, The Return of History and the End of Dreams, whose title was a deliberate rejoinder to The End of History.

In his 2008 Washington Post opinion piece, Fukuyama also addressed this point. He wrote, "Despite recent authoritarian advances, liberal democracy remains the strongest, most broadly appealing idea out there. Most autocrats, including Putin and Chávez, still feel that they have to conform to the outward rituals of democracy even as they gut its substance. Even China's Hu Jintao felt compelled to talk about democracy in the run-up to Beijing's Olympic Games."

His "ultimate nightmare", he said in March 2022, is a world in which China supports Russia's invasion of Ukraine and Russia supports a Chinese invasion of Taiwan. If that were to happen, and be successful, Fukuyama said, "then you would really be living in a world that was being dominated by these non-democratic powers. If the United States and the rest of the West couldn't stop that from happening, then that really is the end of the end of history."

Failure of civil society and political decay
In 2014, on the occasion of the 25th anniversary of the publication of the original essay, "The End of History?", Fukuyama wrote a column in The Wall Street Journal again updating his hypothesis. He wrote that, while liberal democracy still had no real competition from more authoritarian systems of government "in the realm of ideas", nevertheless he was less idealistic than he had been "during the heady days of 1989". Fukuyama noted the Orange Revolution in Ukraine and the Arab Spring, both of which seemed to have failed in their pro-democracy goals, as well as the "backsliding" of democracy in countries including Thailand, Turkey and Nicaragua. He stated that the biggest problem for the democratically elected governments in some countries was not ideological but "their failure to provide the substance of what people want from government: personal security, shared economic growth and the basic public services ... that are needed to achieve individual opportunity." Though he believed that economic growth, improved government and civic institutions all reinforced one another, he wrote that it was not inevitable that "all countries will ... get on that escalator".

Fukuyama also warned of "political decay", which he wrote could also affect established democracies like the United States, in which corruption and crony capitalism erode liberty and economic opportunity. Nevertheless, he expressed his continued belief that "the power of the democratic ideal remains immense".

Following the United Kingdom's decision to leave the European Union and the election of Donald Trump as President of the United States in 2016, Fukuyama feared for the future of liberal democracy in the face of resurgent populism, and the rise of a "post-fact world", saying that "twenty five years ago, I didn't have a sense or a theory about how democracies can go backward. And I think they clearly can." He warned that America's political rot was infecting the world order to the point where it "could be as big as the Soviet collapse". Fukuyama also highlighted Russia's interference in the Brexit referendum and 2016 U.S. elections.

Posthuman future

Fukuyama has also stated that his thesis was incomplete, but for a different reason: "there can be no end of history without an end of modern natural science and technology" (quoted from Our Posthuman Future). Fukuyama predicts that humanity's control of its own evolution will have a great and possibly terrible effect on liberal democracy.

Split between democracy and capitalism 
Slovenian philosopher Slavoj Žižek argues that Fukuyama's idea that we have reached the end of history is not wholly true. Žižek points out that liberal democracy is linked to capitalism; however, the success of capitalism in authoritarian nations like China and Singapore shows that the link between capitalism and democracy is broken. Problems caused by the success of capitalism and neo-liberal policies, such as greater wealth inequality and environmental hazards, manifested in many countries with unrest towards elected governments. As a result liberal democracy has struggled to survive many of the problems caused by a free market economy and many nations would see a decline in the quality of their democracy.

Publication history
Free Press, 1992, hardcover
Perennial, 1993, paperback

See also
Democratic peace theory
End of history
Last Man
Post-truth politics
Sociocultural evolution
Thumos
The Clash of Civilizations
Whig history

Notes

References

Morton Halperin, Joanne J. Myers, Joseph T. Siegle, Michael M. Weinstein. (2005-03-17). The Democracy Advantage: How Democracies Promote Prosperity and Peace. Carnegie Council for Ethics in International Affairs. Retrieved 2008-06-18.
Potter, Robert (2011), 'Recalcitrant Interdependence', Thesis, Flinders University
Mahbubani, Kishore (2008). The New Asian Hemisphere: The Irresisble Shift of Global Power to the East. New York: PublicAffairs

External links 
The Essay
Islam and America... Friends or Foes?
Introduction to Text
Booknotes interview with Fukuyama on The End of History and the Last Man, February 9, 1992
The End of the End of History

1992 non-fiction books
20th century
American exceptionalism
Books about civilizations
Books about cultural geography
Books about globalization
Books about the West
Books in political philosophy
Capitalism
Democracy
English-language books
Free Press (publisher) books
Postmodernism
Works about the theory of history
Universal history books
Works by Francis Fukuyama